Basargi is a rural locality (a village) in Asovskoye Rural Settlement, Beryozovsky District, Perm Krai, Russia. The population was 4 as of 2010.

Geography 
Basargi is located 30 km east of  Beryozovka (the district's administrative centre) by road. Malyshi is the nearest rural locality.

References 

Rural localities in Beryozovsky District, Perm Krai